Alexandra Rochelle (born 14 December 1983) is a French female former volleyball player, playing as a libero. She was part of the France women's national volleyball team.

She competed at the 2013 Women's European Volleyball Championship. 
On club level she played for Béziers Volley.

References

External links
 

1983 births
Living people
French women's volleyball players
Place of birth missing (living people)